In Gallo-Roman religion, Damona was a goddess worshipped in Gaul as the consort of Apollo Borvo and of Apollo Moritasgus.

Name 

The theonym Damona is a derivative of the Proto-Celtic stem *damo-, meaning 'bull' or 'deer' (cf. Old Irish dam 'bull, deer'; also *damato- > Middle Welsh dafad 'sheep', Old Cornish dauat 'ewe'), itself from Proto-Indo-European *dmh2o- ('the tamed one'). The Latin noun damma, which is the source of French daim ('roe'), is probably a loanword from Gaulish. The root *dmh2- is also presumably reflected in the British tribal name Demetae, interpreted as meaning 'Tamers'.

Cult 

Damona and Bormana have been described as the patron deities of the hot springs at Bourbonne-les-Bains and Saint-Vulbas, respectively. Some seventeen inscriptions dedicated to Damona have been recovered, including nine from Bourbonne-les-Bains and four from Bourbon-Lancy, both spa towns in eastern France. In one inscription from Saintes, she has the epithet Matubergini.

Inscriptions and dedications 
There are several inscriptions relating to Damona, including two inscriptions in Bourbon-Lancy (CIL 13, 02805), discovered in 1792.

C (aius) Iulius Eporedirigis f (ilius) Magnus / pro L (ucio) Iulio Caleno filio / Bormoni and Damonae / vot (um) sol (vit)

and (CIL 13, 02806), where Damona is also included in dedications to Borvo, (CIL 13, 02807) and (CIL 13, 02808):

Borvoni and Damonae / T (itus) Severius Mo / destus [o] mnib (us) / h [o] n [orib (us)] and offi [ciis]

The other large site associated with Damona is Bourbonne-les-Bains, there are nine dedications to the goddess of the waters, including (CIL 13, 05911):

Deo Apol / lini Borvoni / et Damonae / C (aius) Daminius / Ferox civis / Lingonus ex / voto

and (CIL 13, 05914):

Borvoni / and Damon (ae) / Aemilia / Sex (ti) fil (ia) / M [3] S

with (CIL 13, 05921):

Damonae Aug (ustae) / Claudia Mossia and C (aius) Iul (ius) Superstes fil (ius) / l (ocus) d (atus) ex d (ecreto) d (ecurionum) v (otum) s (olverunt) l ( ibentes) m (erito)

Damona also appears in dedications to Chassenay, associated with Albius and Alise-Sainte-Reine. An inscription was found bearing Damona's name in Alesia in 1962, where she was worshipped with Apollo Moritasgus (CIL 13, 11233):

Aug (usto) sacr (um) / deo Albio and Damonae Sex (tus) Mart (ius) / Cocillus ex iussu eius v (otum) s (olvit) l (ibens) m (erito)

and (CAG-21-01):

Deo Apollini Moritasgo [and] / Damonae P (ublius) Pontius Apolli [naris]

Finally, there is an inscription in Rivières.

   Jullia Malla Malluronis fîl (ia) numinibus Augustorum et deae Damonae Matuherginni (?) Ob memoriam Sulpiciae Silvanae filiae suae de suo posuit

References

Bibliography

Animal goddesses
Gaulish goddesses
Health goddesses
Water goddesses